The Ladon (Ancient Greek and Katharevousa: , Ládōn; Demotic Greek: , Ládōnas), or Pineiakos Ladonas, to distinguish it from the river of the same name in Arcadia, is a river of Elis in Greece. The river is called the Selleeis (Σελλήεις) by Homer.

References

Rivers of Greece
Landforms of Elis
Geography of ancient Elis
Locations in the Iliad